The Big Show-Off is a 1945 American comedy film directed by Howard Bretherton and distributed by Republic Pictures.  It teams Arthur Lake before his return to the Blondie film series and Dale Evans, most frequently seen with her husband Roy Rogers.

Plot
Nightclub pianist Sandy Elliott is madly in love with nightclub singer June Mayfield, who ignores his existence, preferring the obnoxious Wally Porter, the nightclub emcee.  Sandy follows June to discover to his disgust that she is a big fan of professional wrestling.  Sandy's friend Joe the night club owner decides to make the shy Sandy attractive to June by paying a thug to disrupt June's singing, then being thrown out by Sandy.  Joe adds fuel to June's new, smoldering love for Sandy by making her promise not to tell a secret: that Sandy is really the masked wrestler known as "The Devil".

Cast
Arthur Lake as Sandy Elliott, Shy Pianist
Dale Evans as June Mayfield, Night Club Singer
Lionel Stander as Joe Bagley, Club Owner
George Meeker as Wally Porter, Club MC
Paul Hurst as The Devil, Masked Wrestling Champion
Marjorie Manners as Mitzi
Sammy Stein as Boris the Bulgar, Wrestler
Louis Adlon as Muckenfuss
Dan Tobey as Wrestling Announcer
Douglas Wood as Dr. Dinwiddle
Emmett Lynn as Hobo
Sherry Cameron as Dancer, Cameron and Kirby Team
Klayton Kirby as Dancer, Cameron and Kirby Team
Anson Weeks as Orchestra Leader

Soundtrack
 Dale Evans with the Anson Weeks Orchestra - "There's Only One You" (Written by Dale Evans)
 Dale Evans with the Anson Weeks Orchestra - "Cleo From Rio" (Written by Dave Oppenheim and Roy Ingraham)
 Sherry Cameron and Klayton Kirby with the Anson Weeks Orchestra - "Memories of Old Vienna"
 "Hoops My Dear" (Written by Dave Oppenheim)

External links

Review of film at Variety

1945 films
1940s musical comedy-drama films
American musical comedy-drama films
American black-and-white films
Professional wrestling films
Republic Pictures films
1940s English-language films
1940s American films